Dendrobium smillieae, commonly known as the bottlebrush orchid, is an epiphytic or lithophytic orchid with large, spongy pseudobulbs, thin, bright green leaves which are shed after their first year and crowded flowers in a bottlebrush-like arrangement. The flowers are white, to cream-coloured or pink and the labellum has a shiny, dark green tip. This orchid species is found in some of the Torres Strait Islands, and through Cape York Peninsula to Townsville, Queensland. It is also found in New Guinea and eastern Indonesia (Sulawesi and Maluku).

Description 
The psudobulbs have leaves during their first year, but are leafless at maturity. Flowering occurs from August to November.

A white variety is found in the Sepik swamps in New Guinea.

Taxonomy and naming
Dendrobium smillieae was first formally described in 1867 by Ferdinand von Mueller from a specimen collected near Rockingham Bay by John Dallachy. The description was published in Fragmenta phytographiae Australiae. The specific epithet (smillieae) honours E.J. Smillie.

Distribution and habitat
The bottlebrush orchid is widespread and common, growing on trees and sometimes on rocks, in woodland, forest and rainforest margins. It prefers trees which are exposed to sunlight and commonly grows on trees such as Lophostemon suaveolens (swamp turpentine or swamp box) which have loose papery bark. The roots of the orchid penetrate below the bark and form large mats which are well protected beneath the bark. It is found in New Guinea, including on the Bismarck Archipelago, on the Aru Islands, on some Torres Strait Islands and on the Cape York Peninsula as far south as Townsville.

Ecology
The flowers of this orchid produce nectar and are pollinated by the yellow honeyeater (Stomiopera flava) also known in Queensland as the canary honeyeater. The bird hovers in front of the flowers while feeding on the nectar.

Gallery

References

External links 

 Australian Plant Name Index.
 Global Biodiversity Information Facility

smillieae
Epiphytic orchids
Orchids of Indonesia
Orchids of New Guinea
Orchids of Queensland
Plants described in 1867
Taxa named by Ferdinand von Mueller